This paleomammalogy list records new  fossil mammal taxa that were described during the year 2009, as well as notes other significant paleomammalogy discoveries and events which occurred during that year.

Mammals

 A study by J. R. Foster is published estimating the body masses of mammals from the Late Jurassic Morrison Formation by using the ratio of dentary length to body mass of modern marsupials as a reference. Foster concludes that Docodon was the most massive mammal genus of the formation at 141g and Fruitafossor was the least massive at 6g. The average Morrison mammal had a mass of 48.5g. A graph of the body mass distribution of Morrison mammal genera produced a right-skewed curve, meaning that there were more low-mass genera.

Notes

References 

2009 in paleontology